Colobus flandrini is an extinct species of colobus monkey that lived in Africa (Algeria) during the Miocene around 10 million years ago.

It is the oldest known colobus monkey and is one of only two extinct species of true colobus monkey describe so far, the other species being Colobus freedmani.

Fossils of C. flandrini were originally assigned to Macaca by Arambourg before being assigned their current placement by Delson (1973).

References

Colobinae
Miocene primates
Miocene mammals of Africa